84P/Giclas is a periodic comet in the Solar System. The comet nucleus is estimated to be 1.8 kilometers in diameter. In 1995 precovery images from three nights in September 1931 by Clyde W. Tombaugh were located.

During the 2020 apparition it was not more than 60 degrees from the Sun until September 2020.

On 11 June 2033 the comet will pass  from the asteroid 4 Vesta.

References

External links 
 84P/Giclas – Seiichi Yoshida @ aerith.net
 84P at Kronk's Cometography
 

Periodic comets
0084

Comets in 2013
19780908